The High Sheriff of Wexford was the British Crown's judicial representative in County Wexford, Ireland from the 16th century until 1922, when the office was abolished in the new Irish Free State and replaced by the office of Wexford County Sheriff. The sheriff had judicial, electoral, ceremonial and administrative functions and executed High Court Writs. In 1908, an Order in Council made the Lord-Lieutenant the Sovereign's prime representative in a county and reduced the High Sheriff's precedence. However, the sheriff retained his responsibilities for the preservation of law and order in the county. The usual procedure for appointing the sheriff from 1660 onwards was that three persons were nominated at the beginning of each year from the county and the Lord Lieutenant then appointed his choice as High Sheriff for the remainder of the year. Often the other nominees were appointed as under-sheriffs. Sometimes a sheriff did not fulfil his entire term through death or other event and another sheriff was then appointed for the remainder of the year. The dates given hereunder are the dates of appointment. All addresses are in County Wexford unless stated otherwise.

High Sheriffs of County Wexford
 Sir Richard Synnott of Ballybrennan
1414 John Roche
1423: Robert Bosschier
1543: Patrick de Lonport
1548: Oliver Sutton
1570: Sir Thomas Masterson 
1591: Walter Synnott
1595 : Lodowick Bryskett 
1596: Leonard Colclough
1620: Nicholas Loftus
1627: Patrick Esmonde
1630: Sir Adam Colclough, 1st Baronet, of Tintern Abbey
1649: Walter Talbot of Ballynamony
1652: Thomas Sadleir of Sopwell Hall
1656: Thomas Dancer
1666: Christian Bor
1666: Francis Harvey
1667:
1675: Richard Nunn of St Margaret's
1677: Nathaniel Boyse of Bannow
1678: Matthew Forde
1680: John Cliffe 
1683: Patrick Lambert of Carnagh
1686: Robert Carew
1688: Patrick Colclough of Mohurry or Duffry Hall
1689:
1692: Thomas Sadleir of Sopwell Hall
1694: John Harvey of Killiane Castle
1695: Thomas Sadleir of Sopwell Hall
1696: Edward Kenney of Newfort House
1697:

18th century

19th century

20th century

References

 
Wexford
History of County Wexford